The Lacy or de Lacy knot is a decorative heraldic knot, the badge of the de Lacy family. It features in the crest of the borough of Burnley and heraldic badge of Kirklees.

References

Decorative knots
Heraldic charges
knot
Heraldic knots